Květoň is a Czech surname, which is derived from the given name Květoň, from the Czech kvet, meaning "flower". The name may refer to:

David Květoň (born 1988), Czech ice hockey player
Lukáš Květoň (born 1982), Czech ice hockey player

References

Czech-language surnames